is a shinto kami of the seashore. He is considered to be the ancestor of the Azumi people. He is worshiped at a number of shrines, including  of Kitakyushu, Shika no Umi shrine on Shika Island,

Azumi-no-isora is considered a (lesser) sea deity hired as navigator to bring the emissary Takenouchi no Sukune to the Dragon King (i.e., Dragon God, Ryūjin) in the late legend regarding the loan of the tide jewels to Empress Jingū, attested in various foundation myth documents of the Hachiman cult.

Explanatory notes

References

Bibliography

  e-text version 

Japanese gods
Shinto kami